is a song by Japanese singer-songwriter Hikaru Utada. It was released on the main Japanese radio stations on September 13, 2016, and digitally on September 16, 2016.

Background and composition
"Michi" is an up-tempo J-pop song with an arrangement made entirely out of electronic synthesizers and drums. Apart from a few anglicisms and three lines in its chorus, it is completely in Japanese. It features an optimistic melody, while its lyrics talk about the singer walking a "lonely road", even though she couldn't feel completely alone, as the memory of the person she lost is still with her and guiding her through dark times. In an interview, she explained that it is a "danceable" song, meant to "reiterate that she is doing okay" after the loss of her mother Keiko Fuji to suicide in 2013. Bradley Stern from pop music website MuuMuse found "Michi" surprising, compared to the more "muted tone" of the previously released singles from Fantôme; instead playing like "a continuation of 2010's "Goodbye Happiness", even down to similar-sounding melodies".

Track listing

Release history

Charts

Weekly charts

Year-end charts

Certifications

References

2016 singles
Hikaru Utada songs
Songs written by Hikaru Utada
2016 songs
Universal Music Japan singles